The following are notable Christian missionaries:

Early Christian missionaries
These are missionaries who predate the Second Council of Nicaea so it may be claimed by both Catholic and Orthodoxy or belonging to early Christian groups.

Alopen – first missionary to China (Nestorian)
Apollos
Augustine of Canterbury – missionary to England
Saint Barnabas
Saint Boniface – influential in the conversion of German peoples
Brieuc
Columba – early missionary to Scotland
David of Basra – early missionary to India
Denis – early missionary to France
Frumentius – early missionary to Ethiopia
Saint Kilian – Irish missionary killed in Franconia
Mark the Evangelist
Luke the Evangelist
Pantaenus – early missionary to India
Saint Patrick – early missionary to Ireland
Saint Paul
Twelve Apostles – all of the twelve are considered missionaries  
Ulfilas – missionary to the Goths

List of Catholic missionaries

List of Eastern Orthodox missionaries

Medieval to modern missionaries

Anglican
Geoffrey Bingham – missionary in Pakistan
James Blair – Scottish-born American clergyman in the Virginia Colony, founder of the College of William & Mary
William Duncan – worked with the Tsimshians
James Hannington – saint in Anglicanism who was killed in Uganda
 Richard Johnson – first Christian cleric in Australia
 Francis Le Jau, missionary to South Carolina
Samuel Lyde – missionary to the Alawites of Syria
Robert Machray – clergyman and missionary and first Primate of the Church of England in Canada
Samuel Marsden – missionary to Australia
Henry Martyn – missionary to India
William Mitchell – missionary to India
Charles Pearson – pioneer of the Church of Uganda
Henry Townsend – missionary in West Africa
Cecil Tyndale-Biscoe – missionary in Kashmir
John Wesley – missionary/evangelist in Europe and America
Walter Weston – missionary to Japan, popularized the term "Japanese Alps"
George Whitefield – missionary/evangelist to the colonial United States
John Burdett Wittenoom – missionary to Australia
Charles Stewart Thompson – missionary to India

Baptist
Ellen Arnold – Australian Missionary
Gladys Aylward – Missionary in China and Taiwan
Anne Luther Bagby – Southern Baptist missionary to Brazil
Lauran Bethell – missionary to Thailand and Eastern Europe
Joseph Booth – missionary to what is now Malawi
William Carey (missionary) – Missionary in India Founder of the baptist missionary society
Chow Leung – Missionary to Chicago Chinatown
William Goldsack
Adoniram Judson – American missionary to Burma whose conversion to Baptist beliefs en route to the mission field led to the founding of the first Baptist association in the U.S.
Ann Hasseltine Judson – wife of Adoniram Judson and missionary in Burma. Translated portions of the Bible into Burmese
George Liele – first American missionary; served in Jamaica
Eleanor Macomber – American missionary to Burma
Daniel Sharpe Malekebu – Malawian missionary who served in Malawi
Isaac McCoy – missionary to the American Indians
Lottie Moon – Southern Baptist missionary to China 
Hopestill Pillow – New Zealand female missionary to India in the 19th century, member of the Zenana Missions
Anna Seward Pruitt – part of the "missionary generation" in America, Southern Baptist missionary who worked with Lottie Moon in North China
Cicero Washington Pruitt – Southern Baptist missionary to North China
Issachar Jacox Roberts – Baptist missionary who, at first unintentionally, inspired Hong Xiuquan
 William Ward (missionary) – Missionary and printer in India

Plymouth Brethren
Jim Elliot – missionary to Ecuador
Anthony Norris Groves
George Müller – preached in various countries

Congregationalists
William Scott Ament – controversial missionary to China
Griffith John Missionary in China and companion of Jonathan Goforth
 Thomas J. Arnold Missionary in China during the Qing dynasty
David Bogue – missionary to India, convert from the Church of Scotland
Samuel Dyer – 19th-century China
William Ellis – missionary to the South Pacific and an author
Cynthia Farrar – missionary to India, 1827–1862
Cyrus Hamlin – American missionary in Turkey
Mary Greenleaf Clement Leavitt - first world missionary for Woman's Christian Temperance Union
David Livingstone – missionary and explorer in Africa
Walter Henry Medhurst – revised versions of the Bible for his mission in China
Robert Moffat – Scottish missionary to Africa
Peter Parker – missionary and doctor in 19th-century China
Arthur Henderson Smith – missionary and author, more than 50 years in China
Betsey Stockton – missionary to Hawaii; a freed slave who was one of the first American single women to go on a foreign mission
 Eric Liddell Missionary and athlete in China
Lancelot Threlkeld – linguist and missionary linked to the Lake Macquarie mission
Mary E. Van Lennep – missionary to Smyrna and Constantinople
John Williams – congregationalist in the South Pacific

Methodist
Young John Allen – missionary in Qing China
Francis Burns – missionary to Liberia
Thomas Coke
Thomas Birch Freeman – Anglo-African missionary and colonial official in West Africa
Francis Dunlap Gamewell – chief of fortifications, Boxer Rebellion, China
Mary Ninde Gamewell – American missionary in China; writer
Mary Porter Gamewell – American missionary in China
George Richmond Grose – missionary to China
Joseph Crane Hartzell – missionary work in Africa
E. Stanley Jones – missionary to India
Walter Russell Lambuth – established missionary schools and hospitals in East Asia
Mary Ann Lyth – English missionary, translator, teacher
J. P. Martin – children's book writer and missionary in Africa
Pilipo Miriye – missionary to Nigeria
Sioeli Nau – missionary work in Fiji and Tonga
Samson Oppong – Ghanaian prophet-preacher
Mary Reed – missionary to India
Dorothy Ripley – missionary to the United States
Samuel Evans Rowe – missionary work in Africa
Isaiah Benjamin Scott – African-American missionary to Liberia
Henry Gerhard Appenzeller - American Methodist missionary to Korea 
William B. Scranton - American Methodist missionary to Korea

Moravian
Johann Leonhard Dober Missionary in St. Thomas in the Caribbean
Alexander Worthy Clerk – Jamaican Moravian missionary to the Gold Coast, now Ghana
Christian David – Moravian missionary in Greenland, Livland and Pennsylvania
Rose Ann Miller – Jamaican Moravian educator and missionary to the Gold Coast, now Ghana
Catherine Mulgrave – Angolan-Jamaican educator and missionary to the Gold Coast, now Ghana
Anna Nitschmann – Moravian missionary
David Nitschmann der Bischof – Moravian bishop and missionary in Pennsylvania
Christian Jacob Protten – Gold Coast educator and missionary
Rebecca Protten – Caribbean Moravian evangelist and missionary to the Gold Coast
August Gottlieb Spangenberg – head of the Moravian Church in America in its early days
David Zeisberger – Moravian missionary known for his role in the history of the Christian Munsee
Nicolaus Zinzendorf – Founder of the Moravian church

Presbyterian
Susan Law McBeth – Presbyterian missionary to American Indians and author
Horace Grant Underwood – first Protestant missionary to Korea
Samuel Austin Moffett - American missionary to Korea and founder of Presbyterian Theological Seminary in Pyongyang
Samuel H. Moffett - American missionary to Korea and faculty at Princeton Theological Seminary
Lloyd Kim - American missionary to Cambodia and the coordinator of Mission to the World
Harvie M. Conn - American missionary to Korea and a missiologist
John Livingston Nevius -  American missionary in China who advocated the Nevius Principle
Ralph D. Winter -  American missiologist and founder of the U.S. Center for World Mission
Michael Oh - American missionary to Japan and executive director of Lausanne Committee for World Evangelization
William Chalmers Burns – missionary to China
Nicholas Timothy Clerk – Presbyterian missionary in southeast colonial Ghana
Peter Hall – Presbyterian missionary in colonial Ghana
William Alderman Linton - American missionary to Korea
William D. Reynolds - American missionary to Korea
David Earl Ross - American missionary to Korean and founder of Jesus Evangelism Band (YWAM Korea)
Hunter Corbett – pioneer American missionary to Yantai, Shandong China and Moderator of the General Assembly 1906
Alexander Duff – missionary in India
William Montague Ferry - Presbyterian missionary who was stationed on Mackinac Island.
John Lawrence Goheen – Presbyterian missionary, administer of Ichalkaranji state of British India
William Imbrie – American missionary to Japan
Samuel Kirkland – American Revolution figure who did missionary work among the Tuscarora
Eric Liddell – Olympic athlete who became a Scottish missionary in China
Alexander Murdoch Mackay – Presbyterian missionary to Uganda
George Leslie Mackay – among the first modern missionaries to Taiwan
James Laidlaw Maxwell – among the first modern missionaries to Taiwan
Robert Morrison – first Protestant missionary in China
John Gibson Paton – Scottish missionary to "the New Hebrides" (now part of Vanuatu)
Francis Young Pressly – American missionary to Punjab, Pakistan 1945–1972
Carl Christian Reindorf - Gold Coast historian, minister and missionary
Mary Slessor – Scottish Presbyterian missionary in Nigeria
Absalom Sydenstricker – Presbyterian missionary to China, father of Pearl S. Buck
William James Wanless M.D., F.A.C.S – founded the first missionary medical school in India in 1897
Aeneas Francon Williams (Rev)  – Church of Scotland minister; missionary in the Eastern Himalayas and China
 Clara Anne Williams (ne. Rendall) – wife of Rev. Aeneas Francon Williams; Church of Scotland missionary in the Eastern Himalayas
Asher Wright – missionary to Native American Seneca people
Gladstone Porteous – Australian missionary to China of Scottish descent
Donald Fraser – Free Church of Scotland missionary to Malawi
Robert Grierson – Canadian missionary to Korea
Samuel Cochran – American missionary to China

Other Protestant
Hedvig Posse – Swedish missionary in South Africa, linguist and hymn writer
David Asante – Gold Coast native linguist, educator and missionary
Reinhard Bonnke – German charismatic Christian evangelist
Paul Brand – missionary surgeon in India
Emilie Christaller – German educator and Basel missionary to the Gold Coast
Johann Gottlieb Christaller – German linguist and Basel missionary to the Gold Coast
Aril Edvardsen – Norwegian evangelical preacher and missionary
Jonathan Edwards
Hans Egede – Norwegian Lutheran missionary called "The Apostle of Greenland"
John Eliot – Puritan missionary to the American Indians
Leung Faat – Chinese convert who did missionary work in Southeast Asia and his homeland
Mark Finley – Seventh-day Adventist Church
Jason Frenn – contemporary missionary to Latin America
Theodore Hamberg – Swedish missionary to China
Hermann Herlitz – German pastor and missionary to Australia
Regina Hesse – Gold Coast educator and missionary
Hermann Gundert – German linguist and Basel missionary to India
James Legge – Sinologist and missionary to China
Eugen Liebendörfer – German medical missionary to India
William Miller – Second Advent Movement
Hermann Mögling – German missionary to India
Volbrecht Nagel – German missionary to India
Ludwig Ingwer Nommensen – Lutheran missionary to Sumatra
Torill Selsvold Nyborg – Norwegian Lutheran missionary in Arequipa from 1977 to 1982
Theophilus Opoku – Gold Coast native linguist, educator and missionary
Jorge Armando Pérez – contemporary missionary to Latin America
Susanna Carson Rijnhart – Tibet
Fritz Ramseyer – Swiss builder and missionary to the Gold Coast
Andreas Riis – Danish minister and Basel missionary to the Gold Coast
Helen Roseveare – missionary physician in the Congo
Albert Shelton – Disciples of Christ missionary to Tibetans 
John Smith – West Indies
George Peter Thompson – Liberian minister and Basel missionary to the Gold Coast
Sarah Lanman Smith – Syria
Annie Royle Taylor – China and Tibet
Hudson Taylor – missionary in China
James Springer White – Seventh-day Adventist Church
Rosina Widmann – German educator and Basel missionary to the Gold Coast
Johannes Zimmermann – German linguist and Basel missionary to the Gold Coast

Other Christian
Heidi Baker – co-founder IRIS ministries
Sigurd Bratlie  – Brunstad Christian Church
 William F. P. Burton – missionary pioneering in the Congolian rainforests
Stephen Grellet – Quaker missionary
Robert A. Jaffray – Christian and Missionary Alliance missionary to China
Thomas Raymond Kelly – Quaker
Wayman Mitchell – missionary and founder of Christian Fellowship Ministries 
Raphael Morgan – Jamaican-American Greek Orthodox priest, thought to be the first Black Orthodox clergyman in America
Robert Pierce – founder of World Vision International
Ockert Potgieter – South African missionary to Ukraine
Erika Sutter – Swiss missionary to South Africa
John Allen Chau – American Evangelical, killed by the Sentinelese people after he approached the island in hopes of converting them.
Loren Cunningham – founder of Youth with a Mission (YWAM)

See also
List of Protestant missionaries in China
List of Protestant missionaries in India
List of Catholic missionaries
List of Catholic missionaries to China
List of Catholic missionaries in India
List of Catholic missions in Africa
List of Eastern Orthodox missionaries
List of missionaries to Hawaii
List of missionaries to the South Pacific
List of Slovenian missionaries
List of Russian Orthodox missionaries
List of Protestant missionaries to Southeast Asia
List of Eastern Orthodox missionaries
Timeline of Christian missions

References

Missionaries
list